Pedro Omar Larraquy (born 13 June 1956 in Buenos Aires) is an Argentine former footballer who played as a defender or midfielder. He spent the majority of his playing career at Vélez Sársfield, where he set a record number of appearances with 455. In December 2008, he became interim manager of Vélez Sársfield to replace Hugo Tocalli.

Larraquy started his professional career in 1975, with Velez Sarsfield. He played as a defender at first but in later years he was converted into a midfield player.

In 1979, the club reached the final of the Metropolitano championship only to lose to River Plate. On the strength of his performances Larraquy was selected to represent the Argentina national football team at the Copa América 1979.

In 1980, Larraquy suffered a serious injury that prevented him from playing in the Copa Libertadores. In 1981, he enjoyed one of the highlights of his career, scoring 4 goals in a 5–0 win over Gimnasia y Tiro de Salta.

In 1985, Vélez Sarsfield reached the final of the Nacional championship only to lose this time to Argentinos Juniors.

Larraquy left Velez in 1987, having played 455 games for the club, and scored 82 goals. His goals tally leaves him in 5th place in the club's all-time scorers list.
Between 1987 and 1988 Larraquy played for San Lorenzo de Almagro, he retired in 1988.

Larraquy went on to earn his coaching licence and currently works as the youth team co-ordinator at Velez.

References

1956 births
Living people
Footballers from Buenos Aires
Argentine footballers
Association football defenders
Association football midfielders
Argentina international footballers
1979 Copa América players
Club Atlético Vélez Sarsfield footballers
San Lorenzo de Almagro footballers
Argentine Primera División players